Caribou is the eighth studio album by English musician Elton John, released on 24 June 1974 by MCA Records in the US and on 28 June by DJM Records in the UK. It was his fourth chart-topping album in the United States and his third in the United Kingdom. The album contains the singles "Don't Let the Sun Go Down on Me", which reached number 16 in the UK Singles Chart and number two in the US, and "The Bitch Is Back", which reached number 15 in the UK and number four in the US. Both singles reached number one in Canada on the RPM 100 national Top Singles Chart, as did the album itself.

The album met with lukewarm reviews on its release and legacy reviews do not consider the record to be among John's best work from his early 1970s peak period. However, the album was a commercial success and has been certified double-platinum in the US as well as receiving a gold certification in the UK. The album was nominated for the Grammy Award for Album of the Year at the 17th Annual Grammy Awards.

Background
In the liner notes to the 1995 CD re-release, John described the album as being quickly recorded in January 1974, with only about nine days to get everything recorded, because he and the band "were under enormous pressure" to finish the album and immediately embark on a Japanese tour. Producer Gus Dudgeon added additional backing vocals, horns and other overdubs after John and the band had finished their work. Dudgeon later called the album "a piece of crap ... the sound is the worst, the songs are nowhere, the sleeve came out wrong, the lyrics weren't that good, the singing wasn't all there, the playing wasn't great and the production is just plain lousy".

The album was named after the Caribou Ranch recording studio in Colorado, where part of the album was recorded.

"Ticking" tells the story of a man suffering from a repressed childhood who kills 14 people in a mass shooting in a bar in New York City. Despite being described by Rolling Stone critic Tom Nolan as "the centrepiece fiasco" of the album in his 1974 review of Caribou, in 2015 Rolling Stone readers voted the song their second-favourite "deep cut" of lesser-known Elton John songs.

In addition to the singles, John has over the years played several other songs from this album in concert, including "Grimsby", "You're So Static", "Ticking" and "Dixie Lily". The 1995 CD reissue contains four songs from the general period in and around the release of Caribou, though only two of them, the B-sides "Sick City" and "Cold Highway", were recorded during the album sessions. "Step into Christmas" was recorded during a previous one-off single session, and "Pinball Wizard" was recorded at the Who's Ramport Studios in England, during the sessions for the movie score and soundtrack album of Tommy.

Critical reception

Tom Nolan of Rolling Stone described the album as "dispiriting" and said, "Nearly every song on Caribou suffers from a blithe lack of focus, an almost arrogant disregard of the need to establish context or purpose ... Shifting from sentimental to heavy to mocking, [John and Taupin] not only fail to touch all bases but undercut what credence they might possibly have achieved." Criticising the album's production and the superficiality of the songs, he concluded that Caribou is "a startlingly empty experience".

Stephen Thomas Erlewine's retrospective review for AllMusic called Caribou "a disappointment" and that aside from the two singles, "the album tracks tend to be ridiculous filler on the order of 'Solar Prestige a Gammon' or competent genre exercises like 'You're So Static'".

Track listing
 

Note
On the 1995 CD reissue, "You're So Static" is spelled incorrectly as "Your're So Static".

Personnel 
Track numbers refer to CD and digital releases of the album.

 Elton John – lead vocals, acoustic piano, Hammond organ (9)
 David Hentschel – ARP synthesizer (2, 5, 10), mellotron (9)
 Chester D. Thompson – Hammond organ (8)
 Davey Johnstone – acoustic guitar, electric guitar, mandolin, backing vocals
 Dee Murray – bass guitar, backing vocals
 Nigel Olsson – drums, backing vocals
 Ray Cooper – tambourine, congas, whistle, vibraphone, snare, castanets, tubular bells, maracas
 Lenny Pickett – tenor saxophone solo (1), soprano saxophone solo (4, 5), clarinet (5)
 Tower of Power – horn section (1, 6, 8, 9)
 Emilio Castillo – tenor saxophone 
 Steve Kupka – baritone saxophone 
 Lenny Pickett – tenor saxophone, soprano saxophone, clarinet 
 Mic Gillette – trombone, trumpet 
 Greg Adams – trumpet, horn arrangements (1, 6, 8)
 Del Newman – horn arrangements (9)
 Clydie King – backing vocals (1, 6)
 Sherlie Matthews – backing vocals (1)
 Jessie Mae Smith – backing vocals (1)
 Dusty Springfield – backing vocals (1)
 Billy Hinsche – backing vocals (9)
 Bruce Johnston – backing vocals (9)
 Toni Tennille – backing vocals (9)
 Carl Wilson – backing vocals (9), vocal arrangements (9)
 Daryl Dragon – vocal arrangements (9)

Production 
 Producer – Gus Dudgeon
 Engineer – Clive Franks
 Remixing – David Hentschel
 Assistant Engineer – Peter Kelsey
 Album Coordinator – Steve Brown
 Liner Notes – John Tobler
 Art Direction and Sleeve Design – David Larkham and Michael Ross 
 Photography – Ed Caraeff and Chris Denny
 Recorded at Caribou Ranch
 Remixed at Trident Studios (London, UK).

Accolades
Grammy Awards

|-
| style="width:35px; text-align:center;"|1975 || Caribou || Album of the Year ||

Charts

Weekly charts

Year-end charts

Certifications

References

External links

Elton John albums
1974 albums
Albums produced by Gus Dudgeon
The Rocket Record Company albums
MCA Records albums
Island Records albums
Mercury Records albums
DJM Records albums
Albums recorded at Trident Studios